Laing is a German band currently consisting of Nicola Rost, Larissa Pesch, Johanna Marshall, and Marisa Akeny.

Career
Laing was founded in 2007 by lead vocalist, songwriter, and producer Nicola Rost, vocalists Johanna Marshall and Larissa Pesch, and dancer Marisa Akeny. The group's name comes from the surname of Rost's adoptive mother. Their breakthrough came in 2012 when they represented Saxony in the 2012 Bundesvision Song Contest with the song "Morgens immer müde". They placed second and the song went on to reach the Top 10 and Top 50 in the German and Austrian charts, respectively. They competed in Unser song für Österreich with the songs "Zeig deine Muskeln" and "Wechselt die Beleuchtung". The group qualified to the Top 4, but did not make it to the Top 2 and were eliminated.

Members
The founding members of Laing consist of lead vocalist Nicola Rost, vocalists Johanna Marshall and Susanna Berivan, and dancer Marisa Akeny. In 2012, Berivan left the group in favour of a solo career and was replaced by Atina Tabé. Tabé later left the group as well in 2014 and was replaced by Larissa Pesch.

Discography

Studio albums

EPs
030 / 577 07 886 (2011)
Sehnsucht (2011)
Morgens immer müde (2012)

Singles

References

Musical groups established in 2007
2007 establishments in Germany
Universal Music Group artists
Musical groups from Berlin
German electronic music groups
German experimental musical groups
German pop music groups
Participants in the Bundesvision Song Contest
All-female bands